Bolbitis appendiculata is a lithophyte in the family Dryopteridaceae, seen in evergreen forests. It is found in India, Sri Lanka, Bangladesh, Borneo, Myanmar, Cambodia, China, Hong Kong, Japan, Java, Malaysia, Philippines, Sumatra, Taiwan, Thailand and Vietnam. Fronds are dimorphic, scaly beneath and hairy above.  Sterile lamina dark green and simply pinnate, stalked, oblong, serrate with larger pinnae in the middle, reduced towards both ends. Fertile lamina narrower, elliptic, obtuse and base unequal. Dark brown to black sporangia covers almost the entirety of the underside of the leaf surface (acrostichoid).

References

appendiculata